Lozanić's triangle (sometimes called Losanitsch's triangle) is a triangular array of binomial coefficients in a manner very similar to that of Pascal's triangle. It is named after the Serbian chemist Sima Lozanić, who researched it in his investigation into the symmetries exhibited by rows of paraffins (archaic term for alkanes).

The first few lines of Lozanić's triangle are

                                              1
                                           1     1
                                        1     1     1
                                     1     2     2     1
                                  1     2     4     2     1
                               1     3     6     6     3     1
                            1     3     9    10     9     3     1
                         1     4    12    19    19    12     4     1
                      1     4    16    28    38    28    16     4     1
                   1     5    20    44    66    66    44    20     5     1
                1     5    25    60   110   126   110    60    25     5     1
             1     6    30    85   170   236   236   170    85    30     6     1
          1     6    36   110   255   396   472   396   255   110    36     6     1
       1     7    42   146   365   651   868   868   651   365   146    42     7     1
    1     7    49   182   511  1001  1519  1716  1519  1001   511   182    49     7     1
 1     8    56   231   693  1512  2520  3235  3235  2520  1512   693   231    56     8    1

Like Pascal's triangle, outer edge diagonals of Lozanić's triangle are all 1s, and most of the enclosed numbers are the sum of the two numbers above. But for numbers at odd positions k in even-numbered rows n (starting the numbering for both with 0), after adding the two numbers above, subtract the number at position (k − 1)/2 in row n/2 − 1 of Pascal's triangle.

The diagonals next to the edge diagonals contain the positive integers in order, but with each integer stated twice .

Moving inwards, the next pair of diagonals contain the "quarter-squares", or the square numbers and pronic numbers interleaved.

The next pair of diagonals contain the alkane numbers l(6, n). And the next pair of diagonals contain the alkane numbers l(7, n), while the next pair has the alkane numbers l(8, n), then alkane numbers l(9, n), then l(10, n), l(11, n), l(12, n), etc.

This particular difference triangle has applications in the chemical study of catacondensed polygonal systems.

References

 S. M. Losanitsch, Die Isomerie-Arten bei den Homologen der Paraffin-Reihe, Chem. Ber. 30 (1897), 1917 - 1926.
 N. J. A. Sloane, Classic Sequences

Factorial and binomial topics
Triangles of numbers